The Other Tomorrow is a lost 1930 American Pre-Code film, directed by Lloyd Bacon and produced by First National Pictures, a subsidiary of Warner Bros. The love-triangle drama, from a story by Octavus Roy Cohen, stars Billie Dove, Kenneth Thomson, and Grant Withers.

Plot
The story takes place in a small town in Georgia. Edith (Dove) is a girl who has loved Jim Carter (Withers) since childhood. One day they get into a quarrel and an older and very wealthy man, Norton Larrison (Thomson), seizes the opportunity to court Edith.

Larrison succeeds in making Edith forget Jim temporarily. Edith marries Larrison and then go to Europe on their honeymoon. Soon after they return to Georgia, Edith discovers that she is still in love with Jim. She is determined, however, to be a faithful wife and vows to hide her love for Jim. One day Larrison overhears a conversation to the effect that Jim can never forget his love for Edith. Harrison becomes increasingly suspicious of his wife. It finally reaches the point where he manages to kill all the respect and love that Edith held for him as her husband. The picture comes to a climax as both Norton and Jim each vows to kill the other.

Cast
Billie Dove as Edith Larrison
Kenneth Thomson as Norton Larrison
Grant Withers as Jim Carter
Frank Sheridan as Dave Weaver
William Granger as Drum Edge
Otto Hoffman as Ted Journet
Scott Seaton as Ed Conover

Box Office
According to Warner Bros the film earned $267,000 domestically and $99,000 foreign.

Preservation status
The Other Tomorrow is a lost film. No prints are currently known to exist.

See also
List of lost films

References

External links

1930 films
Lost American films
Films directed by Lloyd Bacon
Films based on short fiction
1930 romantic drama films
First National Pictures films
Warner Bros. films
American black-and-white films
American romantic drama films
1930 lost films
Lost romantic drama films
1930s English-language films
1930s American films